Richard Dumas (born August 21, 1951) is a Canadian former professional ice hockey goaltender. During the 1974–75 season, Dumas played one game in the World Hockey Association with the Chicago Cougars.

References

External links

1951 births
Living people
Canadian ice hockey goaltenders
Chicago Cougars players
Des Moines Oak Leafs players
Ice hockey people from Quebec
Long Island Cougars players
People from Granby, Quebec